The "theology of taint" is a term used in association with belief that a succession of male-only bishops and priests should be maintained within the Church of England. The term is predominantly used by those who oppose this view.

An action associated with the theology of taint is when male bishops who have previously ordained women as priests are excluded from the laying on of hands during ordinations.

The phrase was notably used, in church and mainstream media, when John Sentamu, Archbishop of York, announced that he would not be laying hands on Philip North during his ordination as the Bishop of Burnley scheduled for 2 February 2015. This concession is notable because:
John Sentamu laid hands in the ordination of the first woman as a bishop in the Church of England, Libby Lane, on 26 January 2015
Philip North is not being ordained as a provincial episcopal visitor ("flying bishop")
Philip North would have responsibility for women who are priests as part of his ministry as Bishop suffragan of Burnley

References

External links
Daily Telegraph article
Announcement on the Archbishop of York's website
BBC article
Church Times article

Church of England